Desmoglein-2 is a protein that in humans is encoded by the DSG2 gene. Desmoglein-2 is highly expressed in epithelial cells and cardiomyocytes. Desmoglein-2 is localized to desmosome structures at regions of cell-cell contact and functions to structurally adhere adjacent cells together. In cardiac muscle, these regions are specialized regions known as intercalated discs. Mutations in desmoglein-2 have been associated with arrhythmogenic right ventricular cardiomyopathy and familial dilated cardiomyopathy.

Structure

Desmoglein-2 is a 122.2 kDa protein composed of 1118 amino acids. Desmoglein-2 is a calcium-binding transmembrane glycoprotein component of desmosomes in vertebrate cells. Currently, four desmoglein subfamily members have been identified and all are members of the cadherin cell adhesion molecule superfamily. These desmoglein gene family members are located in a cluster on chromosome 18. This second family member, desmoglein-2 is expressed in desmosome-containing tissues, such as cardiac muscle, colon, colon carcinoma, and other simple and stratified epithelial-derived cell lines. Desmoglein-2 is the only desmoglein isoform expressed in cardiomyocytes.

Function 

Desmoglein-2 is an integral component of desmosomes, which are cell-cell junctions between epithelial, myocardial, and certain other cell types. Desmogleins and desmocollins connect extracellularly via homophilic and heterophilic interactions. The cytoplasmic tails of desmosomal cadherins bind to plakoglobin and plakophilins, which bind desmoplakin. In cardiac muscle, desmoglein-2 localizes to the intercalated disc, responsible for mechanically and electrically coupling adjacent cardiomyocytes. In vitro studies in HL-1 cardiomyocytes have shown that inhibition of desmoglein-2 binding or mutation of desmoglein-2 protein (Ala517Val or Val920Gly) at cardiac intercalated discs results in a reduced strength of cell-cell contact, demonstrating that desmoglein-2 is critical for cardiomyocyte cohesion.

Studies in transgenic animals have provided insights into desmoglein-2 function. Mice harboring a mutation in DSG-2 in which desmoglein-2 lacked parts of the adhesive extracellular domains were serially examined over time. These mice exhibited white plaque-like lesions in cardiac muscle as early as 2 weeks, displaying a cardiac phenotype by 4 weeks that involved loss of viable cardiomyocytes and heavy cell calcification. Other abnormalities included near to complete dissociation of intercalated discs and inflammation, and eventual arrhythmogenic right ventricular cardiomyopathy  with ventricular dilation, fibrosis and cardiac arrhythmia. Studies employing another transgenic mutant DSG2 mouse model harboring an Asn271Ser showed that this mutation caused widening of desmosomes and adherens junctions concomitant with electrophysiologic abnormalities and enhanced susceptibility to cardiac arrhythmias. These changes occurred prior to any cardiomyocyte necrosis or fibrosis. Additionally, it was demonstrated that desmoglein-2 interacts in vivo with the sodium channel protein Na(V)1.5. An additional transgenic model in which desmoglein-2 was knocked out in a cardiac-specific manner showed a loss of adhesive function at intercalated discs in adult animals, albeit normal heart development. In adulthood, 100% of transgenic mutant mice developed chamber dilation, necrosis, aseptic inflammation, fibrosis and conduction defects, as well as modified distribution of connexin-43.

Clinical significance

Mutations in DSG2 have been identified in patients with arrhythmogenic right ventricular cardiomyopathy, along with other desmosomal proteins PKP2 and DSP. Ultrastructural analysis has identified the presence of intercalated disc remodeling in these patients. Additionally, the Val55Met mutation in DSG2 was identified as a novel risk variant for familial dilated cardiomyopathy; patients carrying this mutation exhibited shortened desmosomal structures at cardiac intercalated discs compared to non-diseased patients.

Interactions 

Desmoglein-2 has been shown to interact with:

 DSC1, 
 PKP3,
 Plakoglobin, and
 SCN5A.

See also 
 Desmoglein
 List of conditions caused by problems with junctional proteins

References

Further reading

External links 
  GeneReviews/NCBI/NIH/UW entry on Arrhythmogenic Right Ventricular Dysplasia/Cardiomyopathy, Autosomal Dominant
  OMIM entries on Arrhythmogenic Right Ventricular Dysplasia/Cardiomyopathy, Autosomal Dominant